Boca da Mata is a municipality located in the center of the Brazilian state of Alagoas. Its population is 27,356 (2020) and its area is 187 km².

References

Municipalities in Alagoas